Spilosoma erythrozona is a moth in the family Erebidae. It was described by Vincenz Kollar in 1844. It is found in China (south-western Xinjiang, Tibet), eastern Afghanistan and Himalayas.

Description
Head and thorax white; abdomen crimson above with black bands; white below, with two series of black spots. Wings white, some specimens with traces of a spot at end of cell and sub-marginal spots to both wings.
Hab. JM. VV. Himalayas; Kashmir. Wingspan of the male 40 mm, female 46 mm.

References

 Note: This source misspells the specific name. The original description, linked below, confirms the spelling used here.

Spilosoma erythrozona at BOLD
Spilosoma erythrozona at BHL

erythrozona
Moths of Asia
Fauna of the Himalayas
Fauna of Tibet
Moths described in 1844
Taxa named by Vincenz Kollar